Lloyd Pate (born March 11, 1946) is a former American football running back. He played for the Buffalo Bills in 1970.

References

1946 births
Living people
Players of American football from Columbus, Ohio
American football running backs
Cincinnati Bearcats football players
Buffalo Bills players